Vicki Barnett (born July 8, 1954) is an American politician serving as the mayor of Farmington Hills, Michigan since 2019. A member of the Democratic Party, Barnett previously served as a member of the Michigan House of Representatives from 2009 to 2014, representing the 37th District, and as mayor of Farmington Hills from 2003 to 2007. Barnett was the unsuccessful Democratic nominee for Oakland County Executive in 2016.

Biography
Vicki Barnett was born on July 8, 1954 to a Jewish family in Detroit, Michigan.  She received a Bachelor's Degree from the University of Michigan-Dearborn in 1983, and later received her Master's Degree in Business Administration in 1991, also from the University of Michigan-Dearborn.  She has worked as an investment consultant at LPL Financial in Farmington Hills since 1999, and is a licensed accident, life, and health insurance agent.  Barnett married her husband, attorney Mark Steckloff, in 1981, and together they have two children, Samantha and Jordan. She belongs to the Roosevelt Group of the Greater Detroit Chapter of Hadassah, an American Jewish volunteer women's organization.

Political career
Barnett was elected to Farmington Hills City Council in 1995.  She served two four-year terms in this position until 2003, when she was elected Mayor. She served as Mayor for the maximum two consecutive two-year terms, through 2007.

In 2008, she announced her intention to run for the 37th State House seat, which was left open by the retirement of longtime Democratic legislator Aldo Vagnozzi, who could not run for re-election due to term limits.  Barnett was unopposed in the Democratic primary and faced Republican Paul Welday in the General Election.  Barnett's popularity as Mayor led to a 60%-40% victory over Welday.

In 2010, Barnett retained her seat with an even stronger showing against Republican Chris Atallah, garnering 61% of the vote.  Barnett was thereafter named House Minority Whip.

Barnett won her third and final term on November 6, 2012 by her largest margin, over Republican Bruce Lilley.  Barnett received almost 62% of votes cast in Farmington and Farmington Hills.

Facing term limits, Barnett announced in late 2013 she was running for the Michigan State Senate's 14th District, but narrowly lost a three-way race in the Democratic primary election to the incumbent State Senator Vincent Gregory, who received 34.68% of the vote to Barnett’s 34.28%.

In 2016, she was the Democratic candidate for Oakland County Executive against six-term incumbent Republican L. Brooks Patterson, where she garnered 46.1% of the vote, the highest any Democratic candidate had ever received against Patterson.

In 2019, she again successfully ran for Mayor of Farmington Hills, where she now serves. She was reelected in 2021.

Electoral history

2008 Election for State House
Vicki Barnett (D), 60%
Paul Welday (R), 40%
2010 Election for State House
Vicki Barnett (D), 61%
Chris Atallah (R), 38%
2012 Election for State House
Vicki Barnett (D), 61.6%
Bruce Lilley (R), 38.3%
2016 Election for Oakland County Executive
L. Brooks Patterson (R), 53.5%
Vicki Barnett (D), 46.1%

References

External links
Campaign Site
House Democrats Page

1954 births
Jewish American state legislators in Michigan
Jewish mayors of places in the United States
Living people
Politicians from Detroit
Members of the Michigan House of Representatives
University of Michigan–Dearborn alumni
Women state legislators in Michigan
Mayors of places in Michigan
Michigan city council members
Women mayors of places in Michigan
Women city councillors in Michigan
20th-century American politicians
20th-century American women politicians
21st-century American politicians
21st-century American women politicians
People from Farmington Hills, Michigan
21st-century American Jews